The 1981 New South Wales state election involved 99 electoral districts returning one member each. The election was conducted on the basis of optional preferential voting system. There was a significant change from the 1978 election as a result of the passage of the Parliamentary Electorates and Elections (Amendment) Act 1979, and the Constitution (Amendment) Act 1979. The effect of these Acts was to end the electoral malapportionment requiring that the number of electors within each electoral district be within 10%. Under the previous zoning system, a seat in the "central area" had a quota of 34,067, but could be as high as 40,880 while a "country area" seat had a quota of 26,016 but could be as low as 20,813. The effect of the 1980 redistribution was to create 6 new seats in Sydney Newcastle and Wollongong and abolishing 6 country seats.

Results by Electoral district

Albury

Ashfield

Auburn

Balmain

Bankstown

Barwon

Bass Hill

Bathurst 

The sitting member was Clive Osborne, however Bathurst had become notionally held by  due to the redistribution.

Blacktown

Bligh 

The sitting member was John Barraclough, however Bligh had become notionally held by  due to the redistribution.

Blue Mountains

Broken Hill

Burrinjuck

Burwood

Byron

Cabramatta

Camden

Campbelltown

Canterbury

Castlereagh 

The sitting member was Jim Curran, however Castlereagh had become notionally held by  due to the redistribution.

Cessnock

Charlestown

Clarence 

Clarence had become notionally held by  due to the redistribution and the sitting member Matt Singleton, successfully contested [[Results of the 1981 New South Wales state election (Legislative Assembly)#Coffs Harbour|Coffs Harbour]].

Coffs Harbour 

Coffs Harbour was a new district, notionally held by National Country. Matt Singleton (National Country) was the sitting member for [[Results of the 1981 New South Wales state election (Legislative Assembly)#Clarence|Clarence]] which had become notionally held by  due to the redistribution.

Coogee

Corrimal

Cronulla

Davidson

Drummoyne

Dubbo

Earlwood

East Hills

Eastwood

Elizabeth

Fairfield

Georges River

Gladesville

Gloucester

Gordon

Gosford

Goulburn

Granville

Hawkesbury

Heathcote

Heffron

Hornsby 

The sitting member was Neil Pickard, however Hornsby had become notionally held by  due to the redistribution.

Hurstville

Illawarra

Ingleburn

Kiama

Kogarah

Ku-ring-gai

Lachlan

Lake Macquarie

Lakemba

Lane Cove

Lismore

Liverpool

Maitland 

The sitting member was Peter Toms, however Maitland had become notionally held by  due to the redistribution.

Manly

Maroubra

Marrickville

Merrylands

Miranda

Monaro

Mosman

Murray

Murrumbidgee

Newcastle

Northcott

Northern Tablelands

North Shore

Orange

Oxley

Parramatta

Peats

Penrith

Pittwater

Riverstone

Rockdale

Ryde

St Marys

Seven Hills

South Coast

Swansea

Tamworth

The Hills

Tuggerah

Upper Hunter

Vaucluse

Wagga Wagga

Wakehurst

Wallsend

Waratah

Waverley

Wentworthville

Willoughby 

The sitting member was Eddie Britt, however Willoughby had become notionally held by  due to the redistribution.

Wollongong

Woronora

See also 
 Results of the 1981 New South Wales state election (Legislative Council)
 Candidates of the 1981 New South Wales state election
 Members of the New South Wales Legislative Assembly, 1981–1984

Notes

References 

1981 Legislative Assembly